Coelogyne fimbriata is a species of orchid.

fimbriata